The 2014 Podemos state assembly—officially the 1st Citizen Assembly, and more informally referred to as the Yes We Can assembly—was held between 15 September and 15 November 2014.

Results

Secretary General

Documents

References

Political party assemblies in Spain
Podemos (Spanish political party)
Political party leadership elections in Spain
2014 conferences